Tomahawk is a 1985 video game published by Datasoft.

Gameplay
Tomahawk is a game in which the player pilots a AH-64 Apache gunship.

Reception
M. Evan Brooks reviewed the game for Computer Gaming World, and stated that "Tomahawk does offer cloudbase and turbulence as interesting options, but overall, the simulation is simply not innovative or exciting enough to justify a strong recommendation."

Reviews
Amtix! - Jul, 1986
Amtix! - Nov, 1986
Commodore User - Feb, 1987
Zzap! - Mar, 1987
Popular Computing Weekly - Feb 12, 1987
Computer Gaming World - Jun, 1991

References

External links
Review in Antic
Review in ANALOG Computing
Review in Info
Review in Page 6
Review in Page 6
Review in Computer Play
Review in Your Sinclair
Review in Hardcore Computist

1985 video games
Amstrad CPC games
Amstrad PCW games
Apple II games
Apple IIGS games
Atari 8-bit family games
Combat flight simulators
Commodore 64 games
Datasoft games
DOS games
Helicopter video games
Video games developed in the United Kingdom
ZX Spectrum games